Clarke Johnstone (born 26 April 1987) is a New Zealand equestrian, competing in eventing. 

Johnstone was born in 1987 in Dunedin and grew up on a farm in Otago. From 2000 to 2004, he attended John McGlashan College in Dunedin. In 2008, he obtained a Bachelor of Commerce from the University of Otago. After university, he moved to Matangi near Hamilton in the Waikato, but lived in England between May 2011 and 2013 lived in England in preparation for the London Olympics.

Johnstone took up horse riding aged 12 when his sister talked him into it. At the 2010 FEI World Equestrian Games in Lexington, Kentucky, he won the bronze medal with the eventing team alongside Andrew Nicholson, Mark Todd, and Caroline Powell. At the 2011 CHIO Aachen in Germany, he won the silver medal in the team event alongside Nicholson, Powell, and Jonathan Paget.

Johnstone missed out on selection for the 2012 Summer Olympics; his main horse — Orient Express — was injured and he thus was not chosen. He did get a call for the 2016 Summer Olympics, where he finished sixth in the individual and fourth in the team event. Since 2014, his horse has been Balmoral Sensation.

CCI 4* results
Johnstone achieved the following CCI 4*:

References

External links
 

1987 births
Living people
People educated at John McGlashan College
University of Otago alumni
Olympic equestrians of New Zealand
Equestrians at the 2016 Summer Olympics
New Zealand male equestrians
New Zealand sportsmen
Sportspeople from Hamilton, New Zealand